The Elephant King is a 2006 romantic drama film directed by Seth Grossman.

Story
It is about a depressed teenager who wants to write a story about an anthropologist in Thailand. The anthropologist character is inspired by his older brother who has some debt issues. Meanwhile the teenagers mother wants him to be happy and does things such as set up a date for him.
Eventually the teenager goes to Thailand to try to return his older brother back to the United States of America. He falls in love with a Thai girl and thereby wants to stay in Thailand as well.

Reception
Rotten Tomatoes gives the film a rating of 18% based on reviews from 11 critics with an average rating of 4.2/10.

References

External links 
 
 

2006 films
Thai multilingual films
Thai-language films
2006 romantic drama films
American multilingual films
American romantic drama films
2006 multilingual films
Films directed by Seth Grossman
2000s American films